Albești is a commune located in Ialomița County, Muntenia, Romania. It is composed of three villages: Albești, Bataluri and Marsilieni.

References

Communes in Ialomița County
Localities in Muntenia